The Born Queen is a fantasy novel by Greg Keyes. It is the fourth and final novel in the series The Kingdoms of Thorn and Bone.

Plot summary

In this final  novel of the series, Anne Dare, finally on the throne of Crotheny, goes to war with both the Church and the powerful northern nation of Hansa. Her eldritch powers continue to grow and threaten to overwhelm her. The monk Stephen Darige, now aligned with the Blood Knight, attempts to fulfill his role in an ancient prophecy, while the Holter Aspar White continues to battle abominations and save his forest, while trying to understand the mysteries surrounding him. Meanwhile the dessrator Cazio is rescued by and reunited with his mentor, the swordmaster z'Accato. Queen Muriele and the now badly injured Sir Neil MeqVren are sent by Anne to Hansa on a mission of peace, while they covertly look for a way to defeat them.

External links
 Greg Keyes Official Site
 Summary at Del Rey Online

American fantasy novels
Novels by J. Gregory Keyes
2008 American novels
Del Rey books